is a district of Setagaya, Tokyo, Japan.

Education
Setagaya Board of Education operates public elementary and junior high schools.

Parts of 1-3-chome are zoned to Tsukado Elementary School (塚戸小学校). 6-7-chome and parts of 1-2-chome are zoned to Karasuyama Elementary School (烏山小学校). 4-5-chome and the rest of 3-chome are zoned to Chitose Elementary School (千歳小学校). 4-7-chome and parts of 1 and 2-chome are zoned to Kamisoshigaya Junior High School (上祖師谷中学校). 3-chome and parts of 1-2-chome are zoned to Chitose Junior High School (千歳中学校).

References

Districts of Setagaya